Kingston is a small town in rural Shire of Hepburn in Victoria, Australia. Kingston is located about 15 km from Creswick, just off the Midland Highway and is about 20 km from Daylesford. Kingston's post code is 3364.

Kingston was once a thriving gold mining town during the Victorian Gold Rush, and became the administrative centre of the Creswick Shire until the merging of the Shire and Borough of Creswick on 29 May 1934. Kingston Post Office opened on 11 October 1858.

Kingston once had a large coach and vehicle building manufacturer, Barker Brothers, up to 10 ten hotels, a flour mill and numerous chaff mills. After the miners left so did the industry and in 1976 the railway station and the Creswick–Daylesford train line closed.  The Commercial Hotel, https://www.thecommercialatkingston.com.au ,Kingston's local hotel, has after a 12-year closure reopened and is a very popular watering hole other businesses (such as shops and schools), closed after dwindling trade continuing the vicious circle of declining country towns and the subsequent need to drive greater distances for basic services.

Now, Kingston supports numerous bed and breakfasts including The Commercial Hotel 03 53456576, and rural cropping. The area's rich red volcanic soil and good rainfall support agricultural industries including potatoes (typically grown for food processor McCains), sheep and wheat.  While its location, being around 25 minutes from Daylesford, has started to attract retirees and city folk looking to buy weekenders or holiday houses ( which while they may be transient residents, has provided some much needed new investment and stimulated the local economy).

Kingston still retains some of its old buildings including the restored Commercial Hotel (all the other old buildings are now all in private ownership) such as the old Shire Office building, the former Church of England and Uniting Church, (all now converted into imaginative and spectacular private residences) and a magnificent Avenue of Honour of elm trees dedicated to those who served in World War I.

In December 2004, Kingston Primary School, following years of lack of support by local parents, closed its doors due to declining enrolments after 142 years which means that with the 2013 closure of nearby Smeaton Primary School, children now have to be driven greater distances to the larger schools in Creswick or Daylesford.

References

External links

A Brief History of the Region
Former Creswick Shire Hall-Photo
The Age-School closes after 142 years

Mining towns in Victoria (Australia)
Towns in Victoria (Australia)